Missouri state elections in 2020 were held on Tuesday, November 3, 2020. Aside from its presidential primaries held on March 10, its primary elections were held on August 4, 2020.

In addition to the U.S. presidential race, Missouri voters will elect the Governor of Missouri, four of Missouri's other executive officers, all of its seats to the House of Representatives, all of the seats of the Missouri House of Representatives, and 17 of 34 seats in the Missouri State Senate. Neither of the state's two U.S. Senate seats are up for election this year, but there are also two ballot measures which will be voted on, in addition to one voted on in the August 4 primaries.

To vote by mail, registered Missouri voters must request a ballot by October 21, 2020.

Federal offices

President of the United States

Missouri has 10 electoral votes in the Electoral College.

United States House of Representatives

There are 7 U.S. Representatives in Missouri that will be up for election. Another seat is open after the incumbent, Lacy Clay, lost renomination in its Democratic primary.

Governor

Lieutenant Governor

Attorney General

Secretary of State

Treasurer

State Legislature
All 163 seats of the Missouri House of Representatives and 17 of 34 seats of the Missouri State Senate are up for election. Before the election, the composition of the Missouri State Legislature was:

State Senate

House of Representatives

After the election, the composition of the Missouri State Legislature was:

State Senate

House of Representatives

Primary Election

Senate District 3 - Republican
Polling

Senate District 5 - Democratic
Polling

Senate District 13 - Democratic
Polling

Senate District 23 - Republican
Polling

Senate District 25 - Republican
Polling

Senate District 27 - Republican
Polling

Senate District 29 - Republican
Polling

Senate District 31 - Republican
Polling

Senate District 33 - Republican
Nominee
Karla Eslinger, state representative for district 155
Eliminated in primary
Van Kelly
Robert Ross

Polling

Senate District 33 - Democratic
Nominee
Tammy Harty

General Election

Senate District 1
Polling

Results

Senate District 15
Polling

with Mark Osmack

Results

Senate District 19
Polling

with Michela Skelton

Results

Senate District 33

Ballot Measures
Missouri Amendment 2, Medicaid Expansion passed in the August 4 primary.

Missouri Amendment 3, Redistricting Process and Criteria, Lobbying, and Campaign Finance Amendment is to amend the state constitution to lower thresholds for lobbyists' gifts, lower campaign contribution limits for state senate campaigns and reverse changes to the redistricting process brought about by the passage of 2018's Missouri Amendment 1, known as 
"Clean Missouri". That amendment (aimed to prevent gerrymandering) delegated redistricting to a nonpartisan state demographer and citizens' commission as opposed to the status quo ante of it being left to a bipartisan commission appointed by the Governor.

Polling

Primary Election 
Amendment 2

General Election 
Amendment 1

Amendment 3

Notes

Partisan clients

References

External links
 
 
  (State affiliate of the U.S. League of Women Voters)
 

 
Missouri